A road switcher is a type of railroad locomotive 
designed to both haul railcars in mainline service and shunt them in railroad yards. Both type and term are North American in origin, although similar types have been used elsewhere. 

A road switcher must be able to operate and have good visibility in both directions. As a road engine, a road switcher must be able to operate at road speeds, with suitable power and cooling capacity. It has high-speed road trucks rather than low-speed switcher only trucks. 

Modern road trucks are always equipped with "frictionless" roller bearings, whereas switcher trucks were almost always equipped with "friction" plain bearings, until plain bearings were outlawed in interchange service on both railcars and locomotives.

Overview
For the reasons given above, road switchers are generally hood units.  The set-back cab of a hood unit provides more safety in the event of a collision at speed than most switcher designs, and the rear visibility is much better than that of a cab unit.  Due to their ability to both run at road speeds for long distances and to switch cars, road switchers, as their name implies, are often used for road (heavy-haul) duties, in addition to their yard (switching) duties. Since the 1960s, road switchers have completely displaced cab units in heavy-haul freight service (but cab-type units, adapted from certain road switcher prototypes, have been employed for contemporary passenger service, in selected cases). Some road switchers were provided with twin control stands, so that the units could operate conventionally (locomotive engineer and conductor/switchman facing the direction of travel) in either "long hood forward" or "short hood forward" directions.  However, twin control engineer positions have fallen into disuse as almost all operations are now run "short hood forward".

Examples
Alco's RS-1 was the first successful example of the type, and virtually all modern hood units are laid out in a similar fashion (long hood for all propulsion equipment, short hood for crew accommodations including a toilet). The RS-1, being the first example of a road switcher, and having been initially developed when plain bearings were still common (although not on cab-type road units), often were equipped with plain bearings. Subsequently, roller bearing conversions were implemented, and new units were generally ordered with roller bearings. The RS-1 had a very long manufacturing history, so most 1940s units might be initially ordered with plain bearings (and subsequently converted to roller bearings), but most 1960s units might be ordered with roller bearings.

Fairbanks Morse entered the road switcher field in 1947 with the H-15-44.

EMD was the last to enter the field and failed to capture much of the market with their first road switcher the BL2.

The RS-3 was the best known of the Alco RS road switchers and was produced in more numbers than the RS-1 and RS-2 designs combined.

Although Alco produced the first known road switcher, EMD's GP7 was probably the most successful model from this early period road switchers. Few or no EMD GPs and no EMD SDs were ordered with plain bearings, and any plain bearing-equipped GPs were later updated to incorporate roller bearings.

Modern examples include the EMD SD70 series and the GE AC6000CW, one of the most powerful examples producing .

Horsepower
Road switchers may be divided into: Generation 1,  or lower, net for traction; Generation 2, net for traction; Generation 3, net for traction; and Generation 4,  or higher, net for traction. Although at one point , net for traction, units were made, these quickly fell into disuse, and most have been scrapped by North American railroads.

Transmission
Within the Americas, road switchers are almost always diesel-electric, with the "transmission" system (i.e., the final drive) being either direct current (standard performance units) or alternating current (high performance units). For economic and performance reasons,  and lower units generally have a DC generator, producing 600 volts DC, nominal, whereas  and higher units generally have an AC alternator with integral rectifier, producing 1,200 volts DC, nominal, (alternator/rectifiers remained an option on certain sub- units, for economic and service reasons). Units with AC final drive accept the 1,200 volts DC from the alternator/rectifier and invert this to 1,200 volts three-phase variable-frequency AC.

United Kingdom

The term "road switcher" is not used in the UK. The nearest equivalent is the type 1 locomotive of which there were 5 designs. None of these designs exactly match the Road Switcher. The British Rail Class 14 and British Rail Class 17 have the low engine covers, but the cab is located centrally. Two other designs had the cab near one end like the road switcher, i.e. British Rail Class 15 and British Rail Class 16. However the engine covers reach the cab roof level. The most successful type 1 locomotive is the British Rail Class 20, which still has some members in service. In this case, the cab is at one end with high engine covers.

Germany
The DB Class V 90 and the Voith Gravita are heavy shunters suited for road switching tasks.

Belgium

Belgian state railways NMBS/SNCB operate 170 German built engines in their class 77, both for shunting and for mainline haulage.

Poland

 
PKP class SM42 is a Polish 74-ton diesel locomotive used for shunting and light mainline haulage (version SP42 and SU42). 1822 units were built, used mostly by Polish carriers but some were exported abroad.

Czech
The ChME3 is six axle diesel locomotive with electric transmission built by ČKD. The class were used primarily for yard and road switching services. Units have been operated by Russia, Belarus, Ukraine (as class ЧМЭ3, transliteration ChME3) and other ex-Soviet bloc countries, in Czechoslovakia (as class T669, later as ŽSR 770 and ČD 770 in Slovakia and the Czech Republic), on industrial railways in Poland (S200), in Albania (HSH T669.1), Iraq (DES 3101), Syria (LDE 1500) and in India (DEC 120).

China

The China Railway DF5 is a diesel-electric locomotive used by China Railway in the People's Republic of China. It has been in production since 1976 and is still produced as of 2006 by several local companies. It is the most common road switcher in China and is used for yard and road switching services. A small number are also in service with the Korean State Railway in North Korea.

Japan

The    and JNR Class DE10 are the most common road switcher diesel-hydraulic locomotives in Japan, ordered by Japanese National Railways, used for yard and road switching services. Some private terminal railways also ordered new road switchers or purchased a small number of secondhand road switchers.

References

Locomotives